Monique Cilione (born 19 November 1994) is an Australian javelin thrower who competes in international level events. Her highest achievement is winning a bronze medal at the 2011 World Youth Championships in Athletics in Lille.

References

1994 births
Living people
Athletes from Melbourne
Australian female javelin throwers
People from Keilor, Victoria
Sportswomen from Victoria (Australia)